The World of Miriam Makeba is the third studio album by Miriam Makeba released by RCA Victor. It charted at #86 on the US album chart. Hugh Masekela was credited as the conductor.

Track listing
All tracks composed by Miriam Makeba; except where indicated
"Dubula" –	2:45
"Forbidden Games" (Barry Parker, Marc Lanjean) – 2:56
"Pole Mze" – 2:15
"Little Boy" (Arranged by Miriam Makeba) – 3:22
"Kwedini" (Jonas Gwangwa) – 2:15
"Vamos Chamar Ovento" (Dorival Caymmi) – 3:22
"Umhome" – 2:51
"Amampondo" – 1:55
"Wonders and Things" (Carol Hall) – 3:10
"Tonandos De Media Noche (Song at Midnight)" (Francisco Flores del Campo) – 3:06
"Into Yam" – 2:40
"Where Can I Go?" (Leo Fuld, Sigmunt Berland, Sonny Miller) – 2:52

References

External links

1963 albums
Miriam Makeba albums
Albums produced by Hugo & Luigi
RCA Victor albums